Josef Kristen (born 28 January 1960) is a German former professional track cyclist.

Major results

1980
 3rd  Points race, UCI Amateur Track World Championships
1982
 2nd  Madison, European Track Championships
1982
 3rd  Madison, European Track Championships
1983
 3rd  Madison, European Track Championships
1984
 1st Six Days of Cologne (with René Pijnen)
 3rd  Madison, European Track Championships
1985
 1st Six Days of Stuttgart (with Henry Rinklin)
 1st Six Days of Dortmund (with Roman Hermann)
1986
 1st Six Days of Bremen (with Dietrich Thurau)
1987
 1st  Madison, European Track Championships (with Roman Hermann)
 1st Six Days of Münster (with Roman Hermann)
 1st Six Days of Stuttgart (with Roman Hermann)

References

External links
 

1960 births
Living people
German male cyclists
German track cyclists
Cyclists from Cologne
20th-century German people